The 2002 Preakness Stakes was the 127th running of the Preakness Stakes thoroughbred horse race. The race took place on May 18, 2002, and was televised in the United States on the NBC television network. War Emblem, who was jockeyed by Victor Espinoza, won the race by three quarters of a length over runner-up Magic Weisner. Approximate post time was 6:12 p.m. Eastern Time. The race was run over a fast track in a final time of 1:56.36.  The Maryland Jockey Club reported total attendance of 117,055, this is recorded as second highest on the list of American thoroughbred racing top attended events for North America in 2002.

Payout 

The 127th Preakness Stakes Payout Schedule

 $2 Exacta: (8–2) paid $327.00
 $2 Trifecta: (8–2–12) paid $2,311.00
 $1 Superfecta: (8–2–12–6) paid $6,701.50

The full chart 

 Winning Breeder: Charles Nuckols, Jr. & Sons; (KY)  
Final Time:  1:56.36
Track Condition:  Fast
 Total Attendance: 117,055

See also 

 2002 Kentucky Derby
 2002 Belmont Stakes

References

External links 

 

2002
2002 in horse racing
2002 in American sports
2002 in sports in Maryland
Horse races in Maryland